Kelme Club de Fútbol is a Spanish football club located in Elche, Alicante Province. It is a club with strong philosophy of football academy and does not have a senior team.

Kelme CF derives its name from the sportswear firm Kelme. The philosophy of the club is to train young players, and have a complete structure grassroots level. It has an agreement with La Liga club Villarreal.

Former players

Season to season (Juvenil A)

Superliga / Liga de Honor sub-19
Seasons with two or more trophies shown in bold

División de Honor Juvenil

References

External links 
 

Sport in Elche
Football clubs in the Valencian Community
Association football clubs established in 1974
Divisiones Regionales de Fútbol clubs
1974 establishments in Spain
División de Honor Juvenil de Fútbol